Diego Romero may refer to:
Diego Romero (sailor) (born 1974), Italian sailor and Olympic medal winner
Diego Romero (artist) (born 1964), American ceramic artist
Diego Romero (footballer) (born 1988), Argentine footballer